The Sharzhenga is a river in Nyuksensky, Babushkinsky, and Nikolsky Districts of Vologda Oblast in Russia. It is a left tributary of the Yug. The main tributary is the Andanga (right).

The river basin of the Sharzhenga comprises the northwestern part of Nikolsky District and is located in the Northern Ridge chain of hills.

The source of the Sharzhenga is in the southern part of the Nyuksensky District. The river flows south, enters Babushkinsky District, and turns northeast. In the village of Logduz it turns southeast and enters Nikolsky District. Downstream from the village of Zelentsovo the valley of the Sharzhenga is almost continuously populated, and the forests on the river banks have been cut. The mouth of the Sharzhenga is downstream of the village of Kalinino, between the town of Nikolsk and the selo of Kichmengsky Gorodok.

References

External links

Rivers of Vologda Oblast